Ewhurst may refer to the following places in England:

Ewhurst, East Sussex
Ewhurst, Hampshire
Ewhurst, Surrey